The Luapula cisticola (Cisticola luapula) is a species of bird in the family Cisticolidae. It is found in south-central Africa.

Taxonomy
The Luapula cisticola is monotypic. This taxon was split from the winding cisticola by the IOC and HBW, as were the rufous-winged cisticola, coastal cisticola and Ethiopian cisticola. The Clements (2017) and Howard and Moore (2014) world lists consider these taxa as a single species, the winding cisticola C. galactotes (sensu lato).

Distribution and habitat
This species is found in eastern Angola, Lake Mweru (south-eastern DRC), Zambia, northern and north-eastern Namibia, northern Botswana and north-western Zimbabwe.

Its natural habitats are tropical seasonally wet or flooded lowland grassland and swamps.

References

External links

 Black-backed cisticola (A pre-split name for Luapula and Rufous-winged cisticola) - Species text in The Atlas of Southern African Birds.

Luapula cisticola
Birds of Sub-Saharan Africa
Luapula cisticola